Luke Pople (born 6 June 1991) is a wheelchair basketball player from Australia.

Biography
Pople was born on 6 June 1991 with spina bifida. He began using a wheelchair at eight. , he lives in Dapto, New South Wales.

Pople started playing wheelchair basketball at age thirteen. He plays for the Wollongong Roller Hawks in the National Wheelchair Basketball League. In 2013, we was a member of the Australian Spinners that won to bronze at the International Wheelchair Basketball Federation Under 23 World Championships. He was a member of the Rollers that won the gold medal at the 2014 Men's World Wheelchair Basketball Championship in Incheon, Japan. In 2018, he was a member of the Rollers that won the bronze medal at 2018 Wheelchair Basketball World Championship in Hamburg, Germany.

Pople was a member of the Australian Team that won the gold medal in the 3x3 men's tournament at the 2022 Commonwealth Games.

References

External links
Basketball Australia Profile

1991 births
Living people
Paralympic wheelchair basketball players of Australia
People with spina bifida
Point guards
Commonwealth Games gold medallists for Australia
Commonwealth Games medallists in basketball
Medallists at the 2022 Commonwealth Games